South Carolina Highway 96 (SC 96) was a state highway that existed in the central part of Lancaster County. It was split into two different parts. The two parts effectively served as a bypass of Lancaster and Taxahaw.

Route description
The western segment of SC 96 began at an intersection with U.S. Route 521 (US 521) north-northwest of Lancaster. It traveled to the east-northeast and met SC 200 north-northeast of the city. Northeast of the city, it first met SC 923 and then SC 522 (the latter one was just south of the North Carolina state line). It curved to the southeast and met the southern terminus of SC 273 north-northeast of Taxahaw. It headed to the south-southeast and reached its eastern terminus, an intersection with SC 906 (now SC 9's current path).

The eastern segment of SC 96 was a north–south highway that began at an intersection with SC 9's former path (now US 601) at a point south of Taxahaw. It proceeded in a fairly northerly direction and met its northern terminus, an intersection with the eastern terminus of SC 943 (now Overbrook Road).

History
SC 96's western segment was established in 1940 from SC 200 to SC 906. Its eastern segment was established at this time, as well. In 1942, the western terminus was extended to US 521. It was decommissioned in 1947. It was downgraded to secondary roads.

Major intersections

See also

References

External links
Former SC 96 at the Virginia Highways South Carolina Annex

096 (1940s)
Transportation in Lancaster County, South Carolina